Code: The Hidden Language of Computer Hardware and Software (1999) is a book by Charles Petzold that seeks to teach how personal computers work at a hardware and software level. In the preface to the 2000 softcover edition, Petzold wrote that his goal was for readers to understand how computers work at a concrete level that "just might even rival that of electrical engineers and programmers" and that he "went as far back" as he could go in regard to the history of technological development. Petzold describes Code as being structured as moving "up each level in the hierarchy" in which computers are constructed. On June 10, 2022, Petzold announced that an expanded second edition would be published on August 19, 2022 and he is building a companion interactive website.

The idea of writing the book came to him in 1987 while writing a column called "PC Tutor" for PC Magazine.

Chapter outline 

 Best Friends
 Codes and Combinations
 Braille and Binary Codes
 Anatomy of a Flashlight
 Seeing Around Corners
 Telegraphs and Relays
 Our Ten Digits
 Alternatives to Ten
 Bit by Bit by Bit
 Logic and Switches
 Gates (Not Bill)
 A Binary Adding Machine
 But What About Subtraction?
 Feedback and Flip-Flops
 Bytes and Hex
 An Assemblage of Memory
 Automation
 From Abaci to Chips
 Two Classic Microprocessors
 ASCII and a Cast of Characters
 Get on the Bus
 The Operating System
 Fixed Point, Floating Point
 Languages High and Low
 The Graphical Revolution

Content 
Petzold begins Code by discussing older technologies like Morse code, Braille, and Boolean logic, which he uses to explain vacuum tubes, transistors, and integrated circuits. Code is notable for its explanations of historical technologies in order to build the pieces for further understanding. Electricity is explained through the example of a basic flashlight, which is then expanded upon through the explanation of the electrical telegraph. He noted that "very smart people" had to go down the "dead ends" of mechanical computers and decimal computing before reaching a scalable solution—namely, the electronic, binary computer with a von Neumann architecture. The book also covers more recent developments, including topics like floating point math, operating systems, and ASCII.

The book focuses on "pre-networked computers" and does not cover concepts like distributed computing because Petzold thought that it would not be as useful for "most people using the Internet", his intended audience. Specifically, he said in an interview that his "main hope" in writing Code was to impart upon his readers a "really good feeling for what a bit is, and how bits are combined to convey information".

Reception 
Software engineer and blogger Jeff Atwood described Code as a "love letter to the computer".

Publishers Weekly, shortly after Code'''s publication, said "Initial response, at least among traditional tech book readers, has been positive" and quotes the book's editor, Ben Ryan, as saying "We're trying to cross the boundary of the computer section, and break out Code as general nonfiction science". It also praises both the quality of the physical book and the style of the writing as easy to read and understand.

Ryan Holihan, writing for Input, calls Code "excellent" and that "it is, by far, the most straightforward way of explaining the earth shattering power humans can wield when working with 1s and 0s", in a brief but positive review.Code'' has been included in the syllabi of post-secondary education technical courses, such as "Fundamentals of Modern Software" where it was called "a little dated, but it is a really clear and incredibly accessible presentation of how computers get from electrical currents flowing down wires to programs you can actually use" and other introductory and mid-level computer science and engineering courses.

See also 
 Bit
 Computer memory
 History of computing hardware

References

External links 
 Code by Charles Petzold, interactive companion to the book

1999 non-fiction books
Computer books
Computer science books
Computer programming books
History of computing hardware
American non-fiction books
Microsoft Press books